Satellite Island may refer to:

 Satellite Island (Tasmania), Australia
 Satellite Island (Washington), USA